Walter Thomas Varney (December 26, 1888 – January 25, 1967) was an American aviation pioneer who founded forerunners of two major U.S. airlines, United Airlines and Continental Airlines, which combined under United Continental Holdings long after his death.
Varney was also one of the most prominent airmail contractors of the early 20th century.

Varney served as a pilot in the Aviation Section, U.S. Signal Corps during World War I. After the war Varney established an aviation school and air taxi service in northern California.

Aviation career 
In October 1925, Varney was awarded one of the first contracts under the recently passed Contract Air Mail Act after the determination was made the United States Army Air Corps was not suited for air mail flying. He based his operation, Varney Air Service, in Pasco, Washington, and flew routes between Pasco, and Elko, Nevada, stopping in Boise, Idaho each way. Varney's first airmail flight took off on April 6, 1926.

Varney, following a five-company merger, sold the much expanded Varney Air Group in 1930 to United Aircraft and Transport. The company's name was changed to United Air Lines in 1933.

Continental Airlines was founded in 1934 by  Varney and his partner Louis Mueller as Varney Speed Lines. On July 15, 1934, Varney Speed Lines flew its first trip on a 530-mile route from Pueblo, Colorado to El Paso, Texas with stops in Las Vegas, New Mexico, and Santa Fe and Albuquerque New Mexico. Varney ceded control to Mueller in 1934, and in 1936 a controlling interest in the company was sold to Robert Six who renamed it Continental Airlines in 1937, moving its headquarters to Denver.

In 1932, Varney contributed half of the $40,000 needed to purchase the Lockheed division of Detroit Aircraft Corporation out of bankruptcy.  The company was reorganized in Burbank, California as the Lockheed Aircraft Corporation.  Varney retired from that company in 1951.

Later years and death 
In his later years, Varney suffered from chronic pulmonary emphysema, chronic bronchitis, and valvular heart disease. He lived for a time with the family of his son-in-law, Richard Lambert. He died of bronchial pneumonia on Jan. 25, 1967 at Dani's Nursing Home in Santa Barbara, California.  He was buried in Cypress Lawn Memorial Park in Colma, California in the Varney family plot.

Notes

1888 births
1967 deaths
American aviators
Continental Airlines people
United Airlines people
American airline chief executives
Deaths from pneumonia in California
Deaths from bronchopneumonia
Businesspeople from the San Francisco Bay Area
Businesspeople from Idaho
United States Army personnel of World War I
20th-century American businesspeople